Devin Powell (born March 1, 1988) is a retired mixed martial arts fighter who competed in the Lightweight division of the Ultimate Fighting Championship and Bellator MMA.

Background
A once-aspiring professional guitarist who played in a rock band in his teens, Powell graduated from Marshwood High School in South Berwick in 2006. He attended college for a year before dropping out, and taking a clerical job at the National Passport Center in Portsmouth, New Hampshire. Seeking a creative outlet from the tedium of his day job, Powell began attending an MMA gym in town. Powell started participating in jiu-jitsu tournaments and found some success.

Mixed martial arts career

Early career
Powell had his first amateur fight in 2010, losing by split decision. In a little over a year, Powell won his next three amateur fights. When he fought his first professional bout in 2012, he was ranked #1 among amateur lightweight MMA fighters in the Northeastern United States.

In May 2014, Powell took over The Shop MMA academy in Somersworth, New Hampshire when its owners decided to call it quits. Powell revamped the facility, founding Nostos MMA, a small family-friendly MMA gym which is owned by Powell and managed by his wife Carol Linn Hawkins.

In 2016, Powell went on a rapid win streak of four wins in six months. In February, he defeated Jeff Anderson by unanimous decision at Combat Zone 57. In April, despite hurting his back during the fight, Powell finished Jesse Erickson by first-round TKO to win the New England Fights professional lightweight championship. In June, he debuted on World Series of Fighting, winning a split decision over Tom Marcellino.

While taking a break from training and spending some time recuperating from lingering injuries in the days after a winning the Marcellino fight, Powell was asked in mid-July to step in on short notice to fight in New England Fights' upcoming event Dana White: Looking for a Fight on August 6 in Bangor, Maine. UFC president Dana White would be attending this event, scouting talent to sign to his promotion. The event would also be filmed and promoted through White's reality web series of the same name. Powell, the reigning NEF MMA Professional Lightweight Champion, agreed to rematch Jon Lemke in a three-round non-title fight at a catchweight of 160 pounds.

At Looking for a Fight, Powell pressed the action for most of the fight, using kicks to keep Lemke at range. Despite getting caught with a punch at one point that resulted in a visibly broken nose, Powell continued to press the action. Powell dropped Lemke with an uppercut and immediately took his back for a rear naked choke submission in the first round. During the fight, Powell tore his LCL.

Ultimate Fighting Championship
A few days after his performance in Bangor, Powell was signed to a non-guaranteed four-fight contract with the UFC. In November he was booked to fight at UFC Fight Night: Rodríguez vs. Penn on January 15, 2017. Powell's original opponent was Jordan Rinaldi, but Rinaldi pulled out just before Christmas due to an injury. The UFC quickly signed newcomer Drakkar Klose to his own four-fight contract to replace Rinaldi on short notice. In their fight, Klose defeated Powell decisively, with all three judges scoring the fight 30-27 for Klose.

Powell faced Darrell Horcher on June 25, 2017 at UFC Fight Night 112. He lost the fight via split decision.

Powell faced Álvaro Herrera on July 28, 2018 at UFC on Fox 30. He won the fight via knockout due to kicks to the body in the first round.

Powell was expected to face Claudio Puelles on November 17, 2018 at UFC Fight Night 140. However, it was reported that Puelles pulled out  from the event due to injury and he was replaced by newcomer Jesus Pinedo. He lost the fight via unanimous decision and was subsequently released from the promotion.

Bellator MMA
Powell made his debut for Bellator MMA at Bellator 232 on October 26, 2019, against Marcus Surin. He won the fight by technical submission after his opponent appeared to be unconscious at the end of the second round.

He made his sophomore appearance against Manny Muro at Bellator 252 on November 12, 2020. He lost the fight via unanimous decision and subsequently retired after the loss.

Personal life
Powell and his wife Carol have a daughter, Clementine (born 2012).

Mixed martial arts record

|Loss
|align=center| 10–5
|Manny Muro
|Decision (unanimous)
|Bellator 252
|
|align=center|3
|align=center|5:00
|Uncasville, Connecticut, United States
|
|-
|Win
|align=center| 10–4
|Marcus Surin
|Technical Submission (mounted guillotine)
|Bellator 232
|
|align=center|2
|align=center|5:00
|Uncasville, Connecticut, United States
|
|-
|Loss
|align=center|9–4
|Jesus Pinedo
|Decision (unanimous)
|UFC Fight Night: Magny vs. Ponzinibbio 
|
|align=center|3
|align=center|5:00
|Buenos Aires, Argentina
|
|-
|Win
|align=center| 9–3
|Álvaro Herrera
|TKO (body kicks and punches)
|UFC on Fox: Alvarez vs. Poirier 2 
|
|align=center|1
|align=center|1:52
|Calgary, Alberta, Canada
|
|-
|Loss
|align=center| 8–3
|Darrell Horcher
|Decision (split)
|UFC Fight Night: Chiesa vs. Lee
|
|align=center|3
|align=center|5:00
|Oklahoma City, Oklahoma, United States
|
|-
|Loss
|align=center| 8–2
|Drakkar Klose
|Decision (unanimous)
|UFC Fight Night: Rodríguez vs. Penn
|
|align=center|3
|align=center|5:00
|Phoenix, Arizona, United States
|
|-
|Win
|align=center| 8–1
| Jonathan Lemke
|Submission (rear-naked choke)
| NEF: Lookin' for a Fight
|
|align=center|1
|align=center|3:50
| Bangor, Maine, United States
|
|-
|Win
|align=center| 7–1
| Tom Marcellino
|Decision (split)
| WSOF 31
|
|align=center|3
|align=center|5:00
| Mashantucket, Connecticut, United States
|
|-
|Win
|align=center| 6-1
|Jesse Erickson
|TKO (punches)
| NEF 22: All Roads Lead Here
|
|align=center|1
|align=center|4:00
| Lewiston, Maine, United States
|
|-
|Win
|align=center|5–1
|Jeff Anderson
| Decision (unanimous)
|CZ 57: Clash of the Titans
|
|align=center|3
|align=center|5:00
|Salem, New Hampshire, United States
|
|-
|Win
|align=center|4–1
|Scott Jurgen
|TKO (elbows)
|T2T: Toe 2 Toe Fights 2
|
|align=center|1
|align=center|1:40
|Portland, Maine, United States
|
|-
|Win
|align=center|3–1
|Jonathan Lemke
|Submission (guillotine choke)
|NEF: Fight Night 13
|
|align=center|1
|align=center|0:24
|Lewiston, Maine, United States
|
|-
|Loss
|align=center|2–1
|Bruce Boyington
|Decision (unanimous)
|Coliseum To The Cage: Ruckus
|
|align=center|3
|align=center|5:00
|Derry, New Hampshire, United States
|
|-
|Win
|align=center|2–0
|Andy Robertson
|Technical Submission (triangle choke)
|Cage Titans 9: Live Free and Fight Hard
|
|align=center|1
|align=center|0:37
|Dover, New Hampshire, United States
|
|-
|Win
|align=center|1–0
| Anthony Loycano
|Decision (unanimous)
|CZ 41: Cage Rage at The Rock
|
|align=center|3
|align=center|5:00
|Salem, New Hampshire, United States
|

References

External links
 
 

1988 births
Living people
American male mixed martial artists
Sportspeople from Strafford County, New Hampshire
Mixed martial artists from Maine
Lightweight mixed martial artists
Mixed martial artists utilizing Brazilian jiu-jitsu
People from Somersworth, New Hampshire
People from South Berwick, Maine
Ultimate Fighting Championship male fighters
American practitioners of Brazilian jiu-jitsu
People awarded a black belt in Brazilian jiu-jitsu